John Slater may refer to:

Business and government 
John Slater (industrialist) (1776–1843), (American) father of John Fox Slater, brother and partner of Samuel Slater
John Fox Slater (1815–1884), American philanthropist, son of John Slater (industrialist)
John Slater (art director) (1877–1914), art director at Doulton's Burslem factory
John Slater (New Zealand politician), former President of the New Zealand National Party and current President of Citizens and Ratepayers Now
John Slater (British politician) (1889–1935), British Conservative MP for Eastbourne, 1932–1935
John Slater (Canadian politician) (1952–2015), Member of the Legislative Assembly of British Columbia
John J. Slater Jr. (1925–1998), American lawyer and politician in Massachusetts
John Slater & Co. of Forestdale, Rhode Island

Others 
John C. Slater (1900–1976), American physicist and theoretical chemist
J. D. Slater (1955-), filmmaker and composer 
John Slater (actor) (1916–1975), British actor specialising in Cockney parts
John Slater (cricketer) (1795–?), English cricketer
John Slater (figure skater) (1935–1989), British figure skater and ice dancer
John Slater (musician), British heavy metal guitarist, member of the band Rise to Addiction and former member of Blaze Bayley
John Slater (trade unionist) (1920s-1974), British trade union leader
John Samuel Slater, British professor of civil engineering